Mohammad Bokharaei, was a member of the executive branch of the "Islamic Coalition Party" who was born in 1944 in (the south of) Tehran. He assassinated Hassan Ali Mansur (the prime minister of the Shah) and was executed in June 1965 along with three of his colleagues.

Assassination of Hassan Ali Mansur
Mohammad Bokharai, at the morning of 21 January 1965 at 10am assassinated Hassan Ali Mansur who had been prime minister of Iran since 1964 during the period of Mohammad Reza Pahlavi. When Hassan Ali Mansour intended to get off from the car in front of the front door of the National Consultative Assembly Mohammad Bokharai shot him. As a result Hassan Ali Mansur was killed after some days. Mohammad Bokharai's action was at the time when Mohammad Hadi al-Milani had issued the Fatwa in Mashhad about Mansur's murder.

Execution by the Shah regime 
Mohammad Bokharai was executed at dawn on 16 June 1965, along with three colleagues who were all members of the Islamic Coalition Party, namely Sadeq-Amani, Safar-Harandi and Nik-Nezhad. Those four men were sentenced to death by the Shah regime.

See also 
 Fada'iyan-e Islam
 Navvab Safavi

References 

Executed Iranian people
Iranian prisoners sentenced to death
Islamic Coalition Party politicians
Iranian Islamists
People from Tehran
1944 births
1965 deaths
Assassins of heads of government
People executed by Pahlavi Iran